Erna Martha Frins Pereira (born 31 December 1960) is a Uruguayan physicist. She works as a professor and researcher at the University of the Republic. She was president of the Uruguayan Physics Society from 2007 to 2011. In 2012 she won the National L'Oréal-UNESCO Award for Women in Science for her research in environmental physics.

Career
Between 1979 and 1986, Frins studied chemistry and physics at the University of the Republic. In 1992 she obtained a master's degree in physics from the Technical University of Berlin, Germany, with a thesis on the properties of solid state tuneable lasers. In 1992 she joined the Institute of Physics of the University of the Republic's . In 1998 she completed her PhD in sciences with a specialization in physics at Goethe University Frankfurt, from the study of applications in optics of topological phases.

Beginning in 1999 she coordinated a research team focused on the development of optical methods for remote monitoring of the atmosphere at the Institute of Physics, Applied Optics Group of the University of the Republic. Since 2004 she has been an active member of the National System of Researchers of Uruguay.

Frins was president of the Uruguayan Physics Society for two consecutive periods between 2007 and 2011.

In 2012 she won the National L'Oréal-UNESCO Award for Women in Science, for her project "Métodos ópticos para el estudio de emisiones gaseosas generadas en la operación de centrales térmicas". The project focuses on the development of an optical method for the study of gas emissions in thermal power plants. The technology allows the location of gases that pollute the atmosphere, placing them at specific coordinates.

Frins has carried out numerous research projects in different scientific areas, and has more than 60 publications in scientific media.

References

External links
 Personal page at the University of the Republic Faculty of Engineering

1960 births
Goethe University Frankfurt alumni
Living people
L'Oréal-UNESCO Awards for Women in Science laureates
People from Paysandú
Technical University of Berlin alumni
Academic staff of the University of the Republic (Uruguay)
Uruguayan physicists
Uruguayan women physicists